Jacqueline Anne Harkness Lait (born 16 December 1947) is a British Conservative Party politician and former Member of Parliament (MP) for the constituencies of Hastings and Rye (1992–1997) and Beckenham (1997–2010).

Early life
Lait was born in Paisley, Renfrewshire, attending Paisley Grammar School and the University of Strathclyde, where she received a bachelor's degree in business management. After graduating, Lait worked in public relations for the jute industry in Dundee later working for the television news agency Visnews. Lait worked for the Government Information Service and later the Department of Employment in 1974. In 1980, Lait joined the Chemical Industries Association as parliamentary adviser. She has also run her own parliamentary consultancy.

Political career
Lait was a candidate for Strathclyde West for the 1984 European elections and the following year stood in the by-election for Tyne Bridge where she finished in third place behind David Clelland and Rod Kenyon. She was selected as the Conservative candidate for Hastings and Rye in April 1991.

Lait won the Hastings and Rye seat in the 1992 general election and in 1996 became the first female Conservative Whip. She lost her seat at the 1997 general election, following a dispute with local fishermen, but later in the same year was elected MP for Beckenham via a by-election after the resignation of Piers Merchant.

Upon the election of the new Conservative leader Iain Duncan Smith in September 2001, Lait was appointed Shadow Secretary of State for Scotland. The position had been vacant since 1997 as the Conservatives had no representation in the UK Parliament from Scottish constituencies. Peter Duncan was elected to a Scottish constituency in the 2001 election and he took over as Shadow Scottish Secretary from Lait in 2003 when she became shadow Home Affairs Minister. A reshuffle after the 2005 general election saw her appointed as shadow Minister for London. Two years later, she was handed the additional duties of shadow Minister for Planning.

She over-claimed for the mortgage interest on her second home, and was ordered to pay back over £7,000.

Lait stood down as an MP at the 2010 general election.

Personal life
Lait is married to Peter Jones, former leader of East Sussex County Council.

References

External links 
Guardian Unlimited Politics – Ask Aristotle: Jacqui Lait MP
TheyWorkForYou.com – Jacqui Lait, MP
 
The Public Whip Jacqui Lait, MP's voting record

1947 births
Living people
Scottish politicians
Conservative Party (UK) MPs for English constituencies
Female members of the Parliament of the United Kingdom for English constituencies
UK MPs 1992–1997
UK MPs 1997–2001
UK MPs 2001–2005
UK MPs 2005–2010
Scottish businesspeople
Alumni of the University of Strathclyde
People educated at Paisley Grammar School
Politicians from Paisley, Renfrewshire
20th-century British women politicians
21st-century British women politicians
20th-century English women
20th-century English people
21st-century English women
21st-century English people